Marion Maddox  is an Australian author, academic and political commentator. She is a Professor in the department of Modern History, Politics and International Relations at Macquarie University. Maddox is a regular commentator on issues of religion and politics in the Australian media and is a member of the Uniting Church.  She authored the book God Under Howard: The rise of the religious right in Australian politics which compared the Howard Government with the religious right in the United States and criticised the decline of mainstream Christianity in Australia.

Maddox achieved doctorates in theology and political philosophy from Flinders University and the University of New South Wales respectively. She is also the recipient of an Australian Parliamentary Fellowship. 
 
Maddox has worked at Victoria University of Wellington, New Zealand, the Universities of Adelaide and South Australia. 

In 2002 the Australian Association for the Study of Religion (AASR) Women's Caucus invited Maddox to give the annual Penny Magee Memorial Lecture. The title of her lecture was All in the Family: Women, Religion and the Australian Right.

In November 2017 Maddox was elected fellow of the Australian Academy of the Humanities.

Selected bibliography
God Under Howard: The rise of the religious right in Australian politics,  
Taking God to School: The end of Australia's egalitarian education?, 

Australian Parliamentary Library
For God and Country: Religious Dynamics in Australian Federal Politics, Monograph 07, 2001–02 
Indigenous Religion in Secular Australia, Research Paper 11, 1999–2000
Does a Preamble Need a God?, Research Paper 8, 1999–2000

References

External links
Dr Marion Maddox, Religious Studies programme, Victoria University of Wellington
Book review: God under Howard, The Age, 26 February 2005
Fading religion fanning fundamentalism, author finds report in the Sydney Morning Herald

Australian non-fiction writers
Academic staff of Macquarie University
Living people
Uniting Church in Australia people
Academic staff of the Victoria University of Wellington
Year of birth missing (living people)
Flinders University alumni
University of New South Wales alumni
Academic staff of the University of South Australia
University of Adelaide alumni
Fellows of the Australian Academy of the Humanities